The order of precedence in Ireland was fixed by Royal Warrant on 2 January 1897 during Ireland's ties to the United Kingdom of Great Britain and Ireland.

This is a listing who were the office holders on the 6 December 1922.

Gentlemen

Royal family and Lord Lieutenant

Archbishops, High Officers of State, et al.
Ambassadors
The Lord Mayor of Dublin (only within the precincts of the City of Dublin)
Laurence O'Neill
The Archbishop of Canterbury (Randall Davidson)
The Lord High Chancellor of Great Britain (The Viscount Cave)
The Archbishop of York (Cosmo Gordon Lang)
The Archbishops of Armagh
Roman Catholic (Cardinal Michael Logue)
Church of Ireland (Charles D'Arcy)
The Lord High Chancellor of Ireland (if a peer)
The Archbishops of Dublin
Roman Catholic (Edward Joseph Byrne)
Church of Ireland (John Gregg)
The Moderator of the General Assembly of the Presbyterian Church in Ireland (Rt. Rev. William Gordon Strahan)
The Lord High Chancellor of Ireland (not being a peer)
Sir John Ross, 1st Baronet
The Lord High Treasurer of Ireland (none; in commission since 1817)
The Lord President of the Council (being a Baron, or higher in degree)
The Marquess of Salisbury
The Lord Privy Seal (being a Baron, or higher in degree)
Vacant
The Lord Great Chamberlain (The Marquess of Lincolnshire)
The Lord High Constable of Ireland (office only in existence for coronations)
The Earl Marshal (The Duke of Norfolk)
The Lord High Admiral (none; in commission since 1828)
The Lord Steward of the Household (The Earl of Shaftesbury)
The Lord Chamberlain of the Household (The Earl of Cromer)
The Lord High Steward of Ireland (The Earl of Waterford)

Nobility, bishops, et al.

Dukes, et al.
Dukes of England (ordered according to date of creation)
The Duke of Norfolk, who ranked higher as Earl Marshal
Dukes of Scotland (ordered according to date of creation)
Dukes of Great Britain (ordered according to date of creation)
Dukes of Ireland before 1801
The Duke of Leinster
Dukes of United Kingdom and Ireland created after 1801 (ordered according to date of creation)
Eldest sons of Dukes of the Blood Royal
Prince Arthur of Connaught
Foreign Ministers and Envoys

Marquesses, et al.
Marquesses of England (ordered according to date of creation)
Marquesses of Scotland (ordered according to date of creation)
Marquesses of Great Britain (ordered according to date of creation)
Marquesses of Ireland before 1801 (ordered according to date of creation)
The Marquess of Waterford
The Marquess of Downshire
The Marquess of Donegall
The Marquess of Headfort
The Marquess of Sligo
The Marquess of Ely
Marquesses of United Kingdom and Ireland created after 1801 excepting:
The Marquess of Lincolnshire, who ranked higher as Lord Great Chamberlain
Eldest sons of Dukes according to their Fathers' precedence

Earls, et al.
Earls of England (ordered according to date of creation)
Earls of Scotland (ordered according to the Decreet of Ranking of 1606 and to date of creation)
Earls of Great Britain (ordered according to date of creation)
Earls of Ireland created before 1801 (ordered according to date of creation)
The Earl of Waterford
The Earl of Cork and Orrery
The Earl of Westmeath
The Earl of Meath
The Earl of Fingall
The Earl of Desmond
The Earl of Cavan
The Earl of Drogheda
The Earl of Granard
The Earl Fitzwilliam
The Earl of Darnley
The Earl of Egmont
The Earl of Bessborough
The Earl of Carrick
The Earl of Shannon
The Earl of Lanesborough
The Earl of Arran
The Earl of Courtown
The Earl of Mexborough
The Earl Winterton
The Earl of Kingston
The Earl of Sefton
The Earl of Roden
The Earl of Lisburne
The Earl of Clanwilliam
The Earl of Antrim
The Earl of Longford
The Earl of Portarlington
The Earl of Mayo
The Earl Annesley
The Earl Erne
The Earl of Enniskillen
The Earl of Wicklow
The Earl of Clonmell
The Earl of Desart
The Earl of Lucan
The Earl of Leitrim
The Earl Belmore
The Earl of Bandon
The Earl Castle Stewart
The Earl of Caledon
The Earl of Donoughmore
Earls of the United Kingdom and of Ireland created after 1801 (ordered according to date of creation)
Younger sons of Dukes of the Blood Royal (of which there are none)Eldest sons of Marquesses according to their Fathers' precedence
Younger sons of Dukes

Viscounts, et al.
Viscounts of England (ordered according to date of creation)
Viscounts of Scotland (ordered according to date of creation)
Viscounts of Great Britain (ordered according to date of creation)
Viscounts of Ireland created before 1801 (ordered according to date of creation)
The Viscount Gormanston
The Viscount Mountgarret
The Viscount Dillon
The Viscount Valentia
The Viscount Massereene and Ferrard
The Viscount Charlemont
The Viscount Downe
The Viscount Molesworth
The Viscount Chetwynd
The Viscount Midleton
The Viscount Boyne
The Viscount Gage
The Viscount Galway
The Viscount Powerscourt
The Viscount Ashbrook
The Viscount Mountmorres
The Viscount Southwell
The Viscount de Vesci
The Viscount Clifden
The Viscount Lifford
The Viscount Doneraile
The Viscount Harberton
Viscounts of the United Kingdom and of Ireland created after 1801 (ordered according to date of creation)The Viscount FitzAlan of Derwent, who ranked higher as the Lord LieutenantEldest sons of Earl's according to their Fathers' precedence
Younger sons of Marquesses according to their Fathers' precedence

Bishops
The Bishop of London (Arthur Winnington-Ingram)
The Bishop of Durham (Hensley Henson)
The Bishop of Winchester (Edward Talbot)
All Other English Bishops according to seniority of confirmation of election
Irish Bishops

Barons
Secretaries of State and Chief Secretary being of the degree of a baron
Colonial Secretary (The Duke of Devonshire)
Foreign Affairs (The Marquess Curzon of Kedleston)
War Secretary (The Earl of Derby)
Indian Secretary (The Viscount Peel)
Barons of England (ordered according to date of creation)
Scottish Lords of Parliament (ordered according to date of creation)
Barons of Great Britain (ordered according to date of creation)
Barons of Ireland created before 1801 (ordered according to date of creation)
Barons of the United Kingdom and of Ireland created after 1801

Gentry, et al.
Royal Household officials
The Speaker of the House of Commons (John Henry Whitley MP)The Lords Commissioners of the Great Seal (none; last appointed in 1850)The Treasurer of the Household (George Gibbs MP)
The Comptroller of the Household (Harry Barnston MP)
The Master of the Horse (The Marquess of Bath)
The Vice-Chamberlain of the Household (Douglas Hacking MP)
Secretaries of State and Chief Secretary if under the degree of a baron
Air Secretary (Sir Samuel Hoare MP)
Home Secretary (William Bridgeman MP)
Chief Secretary  (Office abolished)
Eldest Sons of Viscounts
Younger Sons of Earls
Eldest Sons of Barons

Knights of the Garter, Knights of the Thistle and Knights of St Patrick
 Knights of the Garter (KG)
 Knights of the Thistle (KT)
 Knights of St Patrick (KP)

Privy Counsellors, et al.
Privy Counsellors (PC (Ire)) (ordered according to date of oath-taking)The General Officer Commanding the Forces in Ireland and Attorney-General (unless of personal rank) have this precedence, being always Privy Counsellors, and ranking as such, according to the dates of their being sworn in.The Chancellor of the Exchequer (Stanley Baldwin MP)The Chancellor of the Duchy of Lancaster (The Marquess of Salisbury, who ranked higher as Lord President of the Privy Council)

Senior judges, et al.
The Lord Chief Justice (Thomas Molony)
The Master of the Rolls (Charles O'Connor)The Lord Chief Baron of the Exchequer (Vacant)The Lord Justices of the Court of Appeal
The Vice-Chancellor
The Judges of the High Court of Justice, King's Bench Division (ordered according to seniority of appointment)
The Judicial Commissioner of the Irish Land Commission, being a Judge of the High Court of Justice (ordered according to seniority of appointment)
The Land Judges of the Chancery Division, High Court of Justice (ordered according to seniority of appointment)
Younger Sons of Viscounts
Younger Sons of Barons
Sons of the Lords of Appeal in Ordinary

Baronets
Baronets (Bt) (ordered according to date of creation)

Knights
Knights Grand Cross
Knights Grand Cross of the Order of the Bath (GCB)
Knights Grand Commander of the Order of the Star of India (GCSI)
Knights Grand Cross of the Order of St Michael and St George (GCMG)
Knights Grand Commander of the Order of the Indian Empire (GCIE)
Knights Grand Cross of the Royal Victorian Order (GCVO)
Knights Grand Cross of the Order of the British Empire (GBE)
Knights Commander
Knights Commander of the Order of the Bath (KCB)
Knights Commander of the Order of the Star of India (KCSI)
Knights Commander of the Order of St Michael and St George (KCMG)
Knights Commander of the Order of the Indian Empire (KCIE)
 Knights Commander of the Royal Victorian Order (KCVO)
 Knights Commander of the Order of the British Empire (KBE)
Knights Bachelor (Kt)

Other lower ranks, including Esquires and Gentlemen
Companions and commanders of various orders
Companions of the Order of the Bath (CB)
Companions of the Order of the Star of India (CSI)
Companions of the Order of St Michael and St George (CMG)
Companions of the Order of the Indian Empire (CIE)'
Commanders of the Royal Victorian Order (CVO)
Commanders of the Order of the British Empire (CBE)
Companions of the Distinguished Service Order (DSO)

Lower level judges, et al.
The Attorney-General (Office abolished)
The Solicitor-General (Office abolished'')
The Serjeant-at-law
Judges of County Court

Lieutenants and officers of various orders
 Lieutenants of the Royal Victorian Order (LVO)
 Officers of the Order of the British Empire (OBE)
 Companions of the Imperial Service Order (ISO)

References
 
 

Ireland
Politics of pre-partition Ireland